Minto Memorial High School  is a 9-12 high school located in Minto, New Brunswick. MMHS is in the Anglophone West School District.  Minto Memorial serves the area west of Grand Lake, including: the greater Douglas Harbour, Maquapit Lake, French Lake, Lakeville Corner, Ripples, Minto, and Hardwood Ridge.

See also
 List of schools in New Brunswick
 Anglophone West School District

References

Schools in Sunbury County, New Brunswick
Schools in Queens County, New Brunswick
High schools in New Brunswick